Passaro is a surname. Notable people with the surname include:

Alan Passaro, Hells Angel member who stabbed Meredith Hunter to death
Bruno Passaro (born 1989), Argentine Olympic show jumping rider
David Paden Passaro (born 1975), the birth name of the American singer and musician known professionally as Davey Havok
David Passaro, former CIA contractor convicted for assaulting Abdul Wali
Dino Fava Passaro (born 1977), Italian footballer
Dulce Pássaro (born 1953), Portuguese engineer and politician
Francesco Passaro (born 2001), Italian tennis player
Nevio Passaro (born 1980), German–Italian singer, songwriter and producer
Stefania Passaro (born 1963), Italian retired basketball player, a journalist and a certified European Financial Planner

See also
Battle of Cape Passaro
Cape Passaro, Sicily, Italy
Cidade Pássaro, the Portuguese name of the drama film Shine Your Eyes
Pássaro da Manhã, a theatrical one-act drama
Passaro's triangle, a presumptive region in the abdomen